Ray Singer (1916–1992) was an American writer and producer who worked in radio, film, and television.

Singer was from New York. He wrote for radio shows such as The Rudy Vallée Show, The Joan Davis Show, and The Fred Allen Show.

He and Dick Chevillat first collaborated on The Joan Davis Show and were known for The Phil Harris-Alice Faye Show. They later worked on films such as Neptune's Daughter and television shows such as The Frank Sinatra Show. They created the television show It's a Great Life.

Singer, a member of the Writers Guild of America, was active on the Guild's age discrimination committee. He taught film and television writing at UCLA and in the California State University system.

He died in 1992.

References

External links 

Ray Singer at the RadioGOLDINdex
Interview (1988) with Chuck Schaden

 

1916 births
1992 deaths
American radio writers
20th-century American male writers